Adrian Wong (born 1980 in Chicago, Illinois) is an artist based in Hong Kong and Los Angeles. Wong is the co-founder and director of the Embassy Projects art studio. Adrian Wong is a tenured Professor of Sculpture at the School of the Art Institute of Chicago (SAIC).

Biography
Wong has a master's degree in research psychology from Stanford University and a master of fine arts from Yale. He teaches sculpture and critical theory at the University of California Los Angeles and Virginia Commonwealth University.

Work
Wong's works consist of installations, videos and sculptures that draw from various subjects such as 1970s television shows and the artist's relationship to his environment, particularly Hong Kong. "The work that I tend to do is not so much abstract representational sculpture. I tend to make things as what they are. My first year in grad school, I spent a lot of time learning how to build boats," said Wong in TimeOut Hong Kong. The art critic Robin Peckham wrote, "The most significant aspect of his growing body of work is its willingness to play fast and loose with the hallowed if commonplace signifiers of culture and identity, loosening the binds between object and narrative, image and context in a way that contributes back to the parent culture even as it presents highly stylized and aestheticized (but never iconic) depictions of these visual styles to an imagined theatrical audience via a vaguely universal and totalizing sensibility." His work has been included at the Hong Kong Sculpture Biennial, Saamlung Gallery in 2012, Internationale Kurzfilmtage Oberhausen, Louis Vuitton Fondation pour la Création, Bangkok Experimental Film Festival, LOOP Media Art Center and Kunsthalle Wien.

In 2013, Absolut Art Bureau selected Wong to create a bar for Art Basel Hong Kong. Wong created "Wun Dun an Art Bar" that "revives, rekindles and re-imagines an older, more romantic Hong Kong of Suzy Wong, opera lounge singers and awkward waiters."

Wong was awarded the Daniel and Mildred Mendelowitz Memorial Fellowship for the Arts in 2003. He received the Videotage FUSE Fellowship in 2006, the AiR Association/Triangle Arts Trust Residency Programme in 2008 and Detour Design Exchange Tokyo in 2010. Wong won the Sovereign Asian Art Prize in 2013.

He teaches at UCLA Arts and Architecture Department.

Wong currently lives and works in Hong Kong.

Selected exhibitions
2003 
 Crosstown Traffic, John Slade Ely Center for Contemporary Art, New Haven, Conn., USA
 Teetering, Nathan Cummings Art Center, Stanford, Calif., USA
2004 
 Adapt and Overcome!, Holcombe T. Green Gallery, New Haven, Conn., USA
2005 
 Community Theater, ArtSpace Annex, New Haven, Conn., USA
 MFA Thesis Exhibition, Holcombe T. Green Gallery, New Haven, Conn., USA
 Monstrously Tranquil, Ingalls and Associates Gallery, Miami, Fla., USA
2006 
 Fotanian 4, Wah-Luen Industrial Centre, Fo Tan, Hong Kong
 Sleepover Psychedelia, Kapok, Tin Hau, Hong Kong
2007 
 Stable, Para/Site Art Space at Embassy Projects, Fo Tan, Hong Kong
 A Fear Is This: New Work by Adrian Wong, 1A Space, To Kwa Wan, Hong Kong
 Autobibliophiles, Studio Bibliothèque, Fo Tan, Hong Kong
 Moh Goh Yeung, Wan Goh Yeung, Sai Wan Ho Civic Centre, Sai Wan Ho, Hong Kong
 Perpetual Art Machine, Circa Art Fair, San Juan, Puerto Rico
 Dialogue With The Ghosts, Get It Louder, Guangzhou, China
 Ritual For The Ghosts, Para/Site Art Space, Sheung Wan, Hong Kong
 Reversing Horizons, Shanghai Museum of Contemporary Art, Shanghai, China
 Restore, October Contemporary, To Kwa Wan, Hong Kong
 14QK, Para/site Art Space, Sheung Wan, Hong Kong
 Overseas Exhibition: Video Programme, Kubus, Munich, Germany
2008 
 Fotanian 6, Wah-Luen Industrial Centre, Fo Tan, Hong Kong
 Dis Play, Para/Site Art Space, Sheung Wan, Hong Kong
 Anarchitecture Bananas, Artists’ Commune, To Kwa Wan, Hong Kong
 Bangkok Experimental Film Festival, Bangkok, Thailand
 A Tree Without Roots, Olympian City Plaza, Hung Hom, Hong Kong
 4x4, Kowloon Technical College, Kowloon, Hong Kong
 Where the Lions Are, Sheung Wan Civic Centre, Sheung Wan, Hong Kong
 Hong Kong Sculpture Biennial, Hong Kong, Hong Kong
 Ten Workers, W.L. Projekt, Berlin, Germany
 Super Art Team HK: Hooray, 1A Space, To Kwa Wan, HHong Kong
2009
 A Passion for Creation, Louis Vuitton Fondation pour la Création, Hong Kong Art Museum, HHong Kong
 Video Programme, LOOP Media Center, Seoul, South Korea
 Video Programme, Kunstverein, Hamburg, Germany
 All You Need Is Love, Post Museum, Singapore
 This is Hong Kong, Chalk Horse Gallery, Sydney, Australia
 This is Hong Kong, Casa Asia, Barcelona, Spain
 Abstract Cabinet, East Side Gallery, Birmingham, UK
 Video Programme, IFA Gallery, Berlin, Germany
 Video Programme, MAP Office, Hong Kong, Hong Kong
 Pecha Kucha 8, Ambassadors of Design, Central, Hong Kong
2010
 This Is Hong Kong, Kuandu Museum of Art, Taipei, Taiwan
 A Box in the Theatre of the World, Hong Kong Jockey Club, Central, Hong Kong
 /Umbrellahead, I Will Find You (Theatrical Production), Fmr. Married Police Quarters, Central Hong Kong
 FAX, Drawing Center, New York, N.Y., USA
 Ursual Bickle Archiv Programme, Kunsthalle Vien, Vienna, Austria
 City as Play, Museum of Contemporary Art Tokyo (MOT), Tokyo, Japan
 Back to the Future?, Osage Soho, Central, Hong Kong
 Place, Meinblau e.V., Berlin, Germany
 Life, K11, Tsim Sha Tsui, Hong Kong
 0 Budget, What If Space, Wan Chai, Hong Kong
 Not Guilty, Hong Kong Design Week, Victoria Prison, Central, Hong Kong
 Against Easy Listening, 1a Space, To Kwa Wan, Hong Kong
 The Butcher's Deluxe, Angela Li Gallery, Soho, Hong Kong
 Homemade from Hong Kong, SESC São Paulo, São Paulo, Brazil
2011
 The Border Show, Society for Experimental Cultural Production, Shenzhen, China
 International Short Film Festival Oberhausen, Oberhausen, Germany
 Double Happiness, Meet Factory, Prague, Czech Republic
 39 Art Day 9, Asia Art Archive, Sheung Wan, Hong Kong
 Black Margarita (performance), Sotheby's, Hong Kong Convention & Exhibition Centre, Hong Kong
 Troglodyte See the Light (Redux), LTD Los Angeles, Hollywood, CA, USA
 Staged Fictions, Osage Kwun Tong, Kwun Tong, Hong Kong
 Writing Off the Wall, Art HK11, Hong Kong Convention & Exhibition Centre, Hong Kong
 Troglodyte See the Light, Osage Kwun Tong, Kwun Tong, Hong Kong
2016
 Chinese Whispers, Museum of Fine Arts Bern, Bern, Switzerland

See also 
 Nadim Abbas
 Robin Peckham

References

External links
 Adrian Wong at Kadist Art Foundation
 Adrian Wong on Artsy
 Adrian Wong on Saatchi Art

Artists from Illinois
Artists from California
Stanford University alumni
Yale School of Art alumni
1980 births
Living people
Hong Kong artists